The earth-colored mouse (Mus terricolor) is a species of rodent in the family Muridae.
It is found in India, possibly Indonesia, Nepal, and Pakistan.  The earth-colored mouse lives in cultivated fields in raised moist mounds of Earth, where they burrow and locate their nest about 20 cm or 8 inches deep.   Living in a raised mound of soil offers them more oxygen flow from air coming through the surrounding sides as well as from above.  In contrast, their co-existing sibling species Mus booduga burrow in the flat parts of the field, which allows for niche differentiation.

References

Mus (rodent)
Mammals of Pakistan
Mammals of Nepal
Mammals described in 1851
Taxa named by Edward Blyth
Taxonomy articles created by Polbot